The Joseph J. Stoner House is a historic house located at in Madison, Wisconsin, United States. It was added to the National Register of Historic Places on January 17, 1980.

History
In 1865, the house was purchased by Joseph and Harriet Stoner. The Madison Landmarks Commission designated it a landmark in 1972. In 1983, the house was gifted to the Wisconsin Architects Foundation by Madison Newspapers. The foundation went on to move the house to a different location 100 feet away and extensively renovate it at a cost of more than $200,000.

References

Houses in Madison, Wisconsin
Houses on the National Register of Historic Places in Wisconsin
Italianate architecture in Wisconsin
National Register of Historic Places in Madison, Wisconsin